Trojka or Trójka literally means the digit or number three in some Slavic languages (e.g. Serbian, Bosnian, Polish, Czech, Slovak).

The word may also refer to:
 Trójka, Greater Poland Voivodeship, a village in Poland
 Utva Trojka, a Yugoslav light aircraft
 Trojka (TV channel), a defunct Slovak television channel owned and operated by Radio and Television of Slovakia until 2022.
 Trójka or Radiowa Trójka, Polish Radio Program 3

See also
 Troika (disambiguation)

de:Troika (Begriffsklärung)
fr:Troïka
it:Trojka
no:Troika
ro:Troika
ru:Тройка
sr:Тројка (вишезначна одредница)